Ak-Jol may refer to:

places in Kyrgyzstan:
Ak-Jol, Chüy, a village in Sokuluk District, Chüy Region
Ak-Jol, Jalal-Abad, a village in Aksy District, Jalal-Abad Region
Ak Jol, a Kyrgyz political party